Streetwear is a style of casual clothing which became global in the 1990s. It grew from New York hip hop fashion and Californian surf culture to encompass elements of sportswear, punk, skateboarding and Japanese street fashion. Eventually haute couture became an influence. It commonly centers on "casual, comfortable pieces such as jeans, T-shirts, baseball caps, and sneakers", and exclusivity through intentional product scarcity. Enthusiasts follow particular brands and try to obtain limited edition releases.

History
Streetwear style is generally accepted to have been born out of the New York City hip-hop culture of the late 1970s and early 1980s, with elements of Los Angeles surf culture. Early streetwear in the 1970s and 1980s also took inspiration from the do-it-yourself aesthetic of punk, Japanese street fashion, new wave, heavy metal, and established legacy sportswear and workwear fashion brands such as Schott NYC, Dr. Martens, Kangol, Fila and Adidas.

In the late 1980s, surfboard designer Shawn Stussy began selling printed T-shirts featuring the same trademark signature he placed on his custom surfboards. Initially selling the items from his own car, Stussy expanded sales to boutiques once popularity increased. Then as sales peaked, Stüssy moved into exclusive sales to create product scarcity, which established streetwear's focus on T-shirts and exclusivity.

In the early 1990s, burgeoning record labels associated with popular hip-hop acts like Tommy Boy Records, Def Jam Recordings, and Delicious Vinyl began selling branded merchandise embroidered onto letterman and workwear jackets made by companies like Carhartt. By mid-decade, influences included skateboarding and gangsta rap. Professional American sports franchises have had a significant impact on the scene, especially the New York Yankees, Los Angeles Raiders and Chicago Bulls caps and jackets, with their production of oversized team jerseys, as well as boots from The Timberland Company and the latest shoe design releases from Nike, Inc. Brand launches by the chief executives of record companies followed, with Russell Simmons of Def Jam launching his Phat Farm label, Sean Combs of Bad Boy with Sean John, and Jay-Z and Damon Dash of Roc-a-Fella Records launching Rocawear.

Luxury sportswear
Jil Sander was the earliest fashion brand to collaborate with a sportswear firm, Adidas, on a co-creation project in 1998. Since then, the advent of "bling" culture saw established luxury brands make inroads into the market, with Burberry, Gucci and Fendi making appearances in films and hip hop videos. Singer Pharrell Williams partnered with fashion designer and A Bathing Ape creator, Nigo, to create Billionaire Boys Club, credited with mixing Japanese street fashion and streetwear and increasing their visibility in high fashion. Fashion clothing manufacturers began to follow the streetwear companies, co-opting the idea of very limited edition capsule collections, known as "drops", using social media and product scarcity as marketing tools.

In the 2010s, some streetwear brands were coveted as much as the most historically elite fashion brands. Complex Magazine named Stüssy, Supreme, and A Bathing Ape as the top streetwear brands, and many went on to collaborate on prized high fashion capsule collections such as Supreme x Louis Vuitton, Fila x Fendi, A Bathing Ape x Commes des Garcons, and Stussy x Dior.

Contemporary streetwear has an increasing influence on haute couture, and has itself been influenced by runway shows. Designers such as Virgil Abloh and Raf Simons have had a large impact on the evolution of streetwear through their influence on hip hop and popular culture. Other designers such as Demna Gvasalia, creative director of Vetements and Balenciaga, championed trends such as the chunky sneaker and oversized hoodie.

Streetwear is an inclusive style in fashion as it is gender neutral and often designed by people of many different ethnicities and backgrounds.

Hypebeast culture 
"Hypebeast" (occasionally "hype beast") culture is a colloquial term that at first was considered a derogatory term until the Hong Kong journalist and businessman Kevin Ma reappropriated it as the name of his fashion blog, Hypebeast. Even after Ma's fashion blog expanded to a world-famous website, hypebeast still had some negative connotation in the US: namely a lack of authenticity and an interest only in following existing trends. In the UK, hypebeast is a pejorative for a hipster who appropriates designer streetwear and buys only the latest releases, in an ironic imitation of mainstream celebrities like Kanye West. Even though many people will refer to themselves as hypebeasts, taking it as a term of endearment (much like the evolution of the term otaku in Japanese popular culture) others still respond to the negative connotation.

With a growing trend of prominent brand names and logos on clothing, there has been a development of "hypebeast culture" connected to streetwear as of the mid-2000s. Hypebeasts are defined as buying clothes and accessories to impress others. This trend is inspired by a 1990s fashion for clothing covered in brand names and logos. Hypebeasts usually wear a variety of name brands at once to boast their affluence and display popular trends. Another component of "hypebeast culture" is the link to resellers. Resellers will purchase an upcoming trending sneaker to resell it at a higher asking price later. The resale market and hypebeasts can profit from brands by purchasing them for the trend rather than their cultural significance.

Sneaker culture 

Sneakers have been a part of streetwear since the late 1970s. By the late 1980s, sneaker collecting had become a major part of the streetwear subculture, due in large part to the signature shoes of basketballer Michael Jordan. Another sneaker of streetwear has been the Nike Air Force 1, popularized in the hip hop, trap, and grime scenes. Although styles of shoes have changed, the link between sneaker culture and streetwear remains strong. The sneaker market is approximately valued at $85 billion USD in 2022 and is predicted to reach $120 billion by 2026.

See also

 Athleisure
 Ready-to-wear
 Street style

References

1990s fashion
2000s fashion
2010s fashion
2020s fashion
Culture of Los Angeles
Hip hop fashion
Sneaker culture
Street fashion